Up the Ladder is a 1925 American drama film directed by Edward Sloman, written by Tom McNamara and Grant Carpenter, and starring Virginia Valli, Forrest Stanley, Margaret Livingston, Holmes Herbert, Lydia Yeamans Titus and Priscilla Moran. Based on the 1922 play Up the Ladder by Owen Davis, the film was released on May 3, 1925, by Universal Pictures.

Plot
Jane Cornwall, a young heir who is in love with James Van Clinton, sacrifices part of her great fortune to fund her boyfriend's research. James is able to fine-tune his invention, the Tele-vision scope, which meets with great success so that he can marry Jane. But after five years, James begins to neglect both his wife and his job. His attention goes to Helen Newhall, his wife's best friend. Jane, aware of the report, decides not to intervene. The man is facing a new financial crisis and has to resort to Jane's money again. But his wife, at this time, takes over the company's fabrics and puts him in a subordinate position. James puts his head back: working hard, he returns to the company's head. And he reconciles with his wife.

Cast        
Virginia Valli as Jane Cornwall
Forrest Stanley as James Van Clinton
Margaret Livingston as Helene Newhall
Holmes Herbert as Robert Newhall
Lydia Yeamans Titus as Hannah 
Priscilla Moran as Peggy
William V. Mong as Richards
George Fawcett as Judge Seymour
Olive Ann Alcorn as Dancer

References

External links
 

1925 films
1920s English-language films
Silent American drama films
1925 drama films
Universal Pictures films
Films directed by Edward Sloman
American silent feature films
American black-and-white films
1920s American films
English-language drama films